Thomas Edward Groves (1884 – 29 May 1958) was a British Labour Party politician.

He was elected at the 1922 general election as Member of Parliament (MP) for Stratford division of West Ham, and held the seat until 1945. He had wanted to stand again at the 1945 general election, but his name was not sent on to the selection conference which chose Henry Nicholls as the Labour Party candidate. Groves announced that his son would stand as an independent candidate, but when his son withdrew he stood for re-election, and was promptly expelled from his local Labour Party.

References

External links 
 

1884 births
1958 deaths
Labour Party (UK) MPs for English constituencies
UK MPs 1922–1923
UK MPs 1923–1924
UK MPs 1924–1929
UK MPs 1929–1931
UK MPs 1931–1935
UK MPs 1935–1945